The 2004–05 CHL season was the 13th season of the Central Hockey League (CHL).

Regular season

Division standings

''Note: GP = Games played; W = Wins; L = Losses; SOL = Shootout loss;  Pts = Points; GF = Goals for; GA = Goals against

y - clinched league title; x - clinched playoff spot; e - eliminated from playoff contention

Playoffs

Playoff bracket

CHL awards

See also
2005 Central Hockey League All-Star Game

External links
 2004–05 CHL season at The Internet Hockey Database

 
Central Hockey League seasons
CHL